Janja Garnbret first competed in the Climbing World Cup in 2015 in lead discipline at Chamonix, France where she won a silver medal.
In 2016, she started competing in bouldering and then won her first gold medal in the World Cup in Chamonix lead event.
In 2018, she started competing in speed.
In 2019, she became the first person to clean sweep a bouldering season, winning six out of six events.

In lead, she missed finals twice in 2019 Chamonix and 2019 Kranj. She missed the podium four times in 2016 Imst, 2019 Chamonix, 2019 Kranj, and 2019 Xiamen.

In bouldering, she missed finals once in 2017 Vail. She missed the podium three times in 2016 Meiringen, 2017 Meiringen, and 2017 Vail.

In speed, she has advanced into finals twice in Salt Lake City and Villars, both in 2021.

Climbing World Cup

References 

IFSC Climbing World Cup